Beastie Boys Anthology: The Sounds of Science is the first anthology album by American rap rock group Beastie Boys composed of greatest hits, B-sides, and previously unreleased tracks. The retail release comes with a tri-fold sleeve that displays the majority of the band's album covers, as well as a booklet of liner notes. The title of the anthology is from the song of the same name, featured on their second album, Paul's Boutique.

Customers could also purchase through mail order a custom version of the album from Grand Royal featuring the B-sides and rarities.

Track listing

Omission of "Rock Hard"
The band wanted to include their first major-label single "Rock Hard", which had been out of print since 1985, on this compilation. However, the song was not included because it contained samples from the AC/DC song "Back in Black", which were used without permission. Their desire to include the song was thwarted when AC/DC refused to grant clearance for the sample to be used. Mike D spoke to AC/DC's Malcolm Young personally on the phone when their lawyers refused to clear the sample, to no avail.

Charts

Weekly charts

Year-end charts

Certifications

Publication

References

1999 compilation albums
Beastie Boys compilation albums
Grand Royal compilation albums
Albums produced by Mario Caldato Jr.